First Maeen Cabinet was a government led by Yemeni prime minister Maeen Abdulmalek from 15 October 2018 to 18 December 2020. On 18 October 2018 Maeen Abdulmalek sworn in before President Abdrabbuh Mansur Hadi.

List of ministers

See also 

 Politics of Yemen

References 

Cabinets of Yemen
2018 establishments in Yemen
First Maeen Cabinet